"Sweet Sixteen" is a song by British singer-songwriter Billy Idol, released in 1987 as the third single from his third studio album Whiplash Smile (1986). The song written by Idol and produced by Keith Forsey. "Sweet Sixteen" peaked at No. 20 in the US and No. 17 in the UK. It was also a hit across Europe and beyond.

Background 
"Sweet Sixteen" was inspired by the true story of Edward Leedskalnin, a Latvian emigrant who single-handedly built the Coral Castle in Florida. In Latvia, Leedskalnin was set to marry Agnes Skuvst, but she broke the engagement and Leedskalnin decided to emigrate to America. He built the Coral Castle there in dedication to Skuvst, who he often referred to as his "Sweet Sixteen". Idol wrote the song after watching "The Castle of Secrets", an episode of Leonard Nimoy's program In Search of... which was based on Coral Castle. The song was written during the making of Idol's 1983 album Rebel Yell.

In his 2014 autobiography, Idol described the song as a "heartfelt lament". He added that while the castle was Leedskalnin's "coral memorial" to his former love, "Sweet Sixteen" was Idol's to his then-girlfriend Perri Lister.

Music video 
Two music videos were filmed to promote the single. The black-and-white version, directed by Peter Sinclair, featured Idol performing the song in an empty room. An alternative video, filmed in colour, featured scenes shot at Coral Castle.

Release 
The single was released on 7", 12" and cassette by Chrysalis. The B-Side was the Whiplash Smile album track "Beyond Belief. For the 12" single, another track from the album, "One Night, One Chance" was also included. The UK edition of the 12" single, which was also released in some other European countries, included an extended version of "Rebel Yell" instead.

Critical reception 
In a contemporary review of Whiplash Smile, Rolling Stone described the song as having an "acoustic shuffle", which "recalled the texture" of Idol's 1984 hit "Eyes Without a Face". Billboard noted in their review of the album: "...quick spins of "World's Forgotten Boy," "Sweet Sixteen," and "Don't Need a Gun" provide positive indication that Idol is rocking on the right track." In a retrospective AllMusic review of the album, Johnny Loftus commented on the song's "weird, Marty Robbins-meets-Del Shannon-in-space vibe." Loftus also selected the song as one of the album's highlights by labelling it an AMG Pick Track. On the 30th anniversary of the album, Ultimate Classic Rock described the song as a "relatively stripped-back acoustic love song".

Formats 
7" single
"Sweet Sixteen" – 4:14
"Beyond Belief" – 4:00

7" single (Costa Rican release)
"Sweet Sixteen" – 4:14
"Man For All Seasons" – 4:38

7" single (US promo release)
"Sweet Sixteen" – 4:14
"Sweet Sixteen" – 4:14

7" single (Australian limited edition double-pack release)
"Sweet Sixteen" – 4:14
"Beyond Belief" – 4:00
"Mony Mony (Extended Version)" – 5:01
"White Wedding (Extended Version)" – 8:20

12" single (UK and European release)
"Sweet Sixteen" – 4:14
"Beyond Belief" – 4:00
"Rebel Yell (Extended Version)" – 4:45

12" single (European release)
"Sweet Sixteen" – 4:14
"Beyond Belief" – 4:00
"One Night, One Chance" – 3:52

12" single (US promo release)
"Sweet Sixteen" – 4:14
"Sweet Sixteen" – 4:14

Cassette single (UK release)
"Sweet Sixteen" – 4:14
"Beyond Belief" – 4:00

Cassette single (Canadian limited edition release)
"Sweet Sixteen" – 4:14
"White Wedding" – 4:12

Cassette single (1990 US release)
"Sweet Sixteen" – 4:14
"To Be a Lover" – 3:51

Charts

Weekly charts

Year-end charts

Personnel 
 Billy Idol – vocals, guitar
 Steve Stevens – guitar
 Marcus Miller – bass
 Keith Forsey – producer, keyboards
 Thommy Price – drums
 Gary Langan – mixing
 Pat Gorman – design
 Dick Zimmerman – photography

References 

1986 songs
1987 singles
Billy Idol songs
Black-and-white music videos
Chrysalis Records singles
Songs about teenagers